Microsomal prostaglandin E synthase-2 (mPGES-2) or Prostaglandin E synthase 2 is an enzyme that in humans encoded by the PTGES2 gene located on chromosome 9. The protein encoded by this gene is a membrane-associated prostaglandin E synthase, which catalyzes the conversion of prostaglandin H2 to prostaglandin E2. This protein also has been shown to activate the transcription regulated by a gamma-interferon-activated transcription element (GATE). Multiple transcript variants have been found for this gene.

Structure 
Microsomal prostaglandin E synthase type-2 (mPTGES2) has been crystallized with an anti-inflammatory drug indomethacin (IMN). The N-terminal of mPTGES2 is attached to the lipid membrane and the two hydrophobic pockets connected to form a V shape are located in the bottom of a large cavity for IMN binding. The mPTGES2 exists in a dimer.

Function 

The gene encoding the PTGES2 protein contains 10 exons. The PTGE2 protein encoded by the gene is a 33-kDa membrane-associated  prostaglandin E synthase that is thought to be targeted to the Golgi apparatus as well as the mitochondrion within the cell. Prostaglandin E synthase catalyzes the conversion of prostaglandin H2 to prostaglandin E2. The particular reaction catalyzed by PTGE2 is thought to be:

(5Z,13E)-(15S)-9-alpha,11-alpha-epidioxy-15-hydroxyprosta-5,13-dienoate = (5Z,13E)-(15S)-11-alpha,15-dihydroxy-9-oxoprosta-5,13-dienoate.

The PTGE2 protein functions in part of the prostaglandin synthesis pathway, which forms a component of the overall lipid synthesis mechanism in the human body. The activity of PTGES2 is thought to be increased in the presence of sulfhydryl compounds, in particular dithiothreitol.

The PTGE2 protein also has been shown to activate the transcription regulated by an interferon-gamma gamma-interferon-activated transcription element (GATE).

				
Model organisms have been used in the study of PTGES2 function. A conditional knockout mouse line, called Ptges2tm1a(EUCOMM)Wtsi was generated as part of the International Knockout Mouse Consortium program — a high-throughput mutagenesis project to generate and distribute animal models of disease to interested scientists — at the Wellcome Trust Sanger Institute.

Male and female animals underwent a standardized phenotypic screen to determine the effects of deletion. Twenty two tests were carried out on mutant mice, but no significant abnormalities were observed.

Clinical significance

The excess production of prostaglandin E 2 is known to contribute to inflammatory diseases which includes rheumatoid arthritis, atherosclerosis, and cancer. Furthermore, naturally occurring polymorphisms of PTGES2 have been shown to be associated with increased risks for diabetes mellitus and metabolic syndromes.

As such, pharmacological inhibition of prostaglandin E 2 production by synthetic minor prenylated chalcones and flavonoids has potential therapeutic viability. It has been shown that the synthesis of prostaglandin E 2 in the endothelial cells of the brain is important for inflammation-induced fever. Additionally, investigators have observed elevations in cell doubling rates for several cancer cell types in the presence of prostaglandin E 2 –producing cell lines.

References

External links

Further reading 

 
 
 
 
 
 
 
 
 
 
 
 
 
 
 
 
 
 

Genes mutated in mice